Bălășești is a commune in Sîngerei District, Moldova. It is composed of two villages, Bălășești and Sloveanca.

References

Communes of Sîngerei District